Gregory County may refer to:
 Gregory County, South Dakota, United States
 Gregory County, New South Wales, Australia